The Boston College Eagles college football team competes as part of the National Collegiate Athletic Association (NCAA) Division I Football Bowl Subdivision (FBS), representing Boston College in the Atlantic Division of the Atlantic Coast Conference (ACC). Since the establishment of the team in 1892, Boston College has appeared in 26 bowl games. Included in these games are 4 combined appearances in the traditional "major" bowl games (the Rose, Sugar, Cotton, Fiesta, and Orange), all of which came in their first six bowl appearances. Their victory in the 1941 Sugar Bowl over Tennessee gave Boston College a claim on the national championship, having received votes from various selectors. However, the NCAA only lists Minnesota as having won that year. 

BC's 14–13 bowl record in 28 bowl games (with one no-contest) place the school tied for 38th in all-time bowl wins.

Bowl games

† After Boston College led 7–0 in first quarter, the 2018 First Responder Bowl was delayed and eventually canceled due to dangerous lightning strikes. It is considered a no-contest for both teams.

‡ The 2021 Military Bowl was cancelled the day before it was scheduled, due to a large number COVID-19 cases within the Boston College program.

Notes

References
General

Specific

Boston College

Boston College Eagles bowl games